Epsilon Leonis (ε Leo, ε Leonis) is the fifth-brightest star in the constellation Leo, consistent with its Bayer designation Epsilon. It is known as Algenubi or Ras Elased Australis. Both names mean "the southern star of the lion's head". Australis is Latin for "southern" and Genubi is Arabic for "south".

Properties 

It is much larger and brighter than the Sun with a luminosity 288 times and a radius 21 times solar. Consequently, its absolute magnitude is actually –1.49, making it one of the more luminous stars in the constellation, significantly more than Regulus. Its apparent brightness, though, is only 2.98. At this distance, the visual magnitude of Epsilon Leonis is reduced by 0.03 as a result of extinction caused by intervening gas and dust.

Epsilon Leonis exhibits the characteristics of a Cepheid-like variable, changing by an amplitude of 0.3 magnitude every few days. Based upon its iron abundance, the metallicity of this star's outer atmosphere is only around 52% of the Sun's. That is, the abundance of elements other than hydrogen and helium is about half that in the Sun.

See also 
 Lists of stars in the constellation Leo
 Class G Stars
 Variable star

References 

Leo (constellation)
Leonis, Epsilon
Algenubi
Leonis, 17
Classical Cepheid variables
G-type bright giants
047908
3873
084441
Suspected variables
Durchmusterung objects